is a Japanese model represented by Twin Planet. She serves as the president of the Japan Lolita Association for lolita fashion.

Misako was discovered as a model in Harajuku, Tokyo at the age of 15. While modeling for KERA magazine, Misako was given the opportunity to wear lolita fashion. Initially, she was not a big fan of lolita fashion, but by modeling it, her confidence in wearing the fashion grew. Misako entered Tokai University Junior College of Nursing and Technology with the intention of practicing nursing. She divides her time between nursing and promoting lolita fashion. This was documented on the Kansai TV show,  in 2017.

In 2009, Misako was appointed by the Foreign Ministry to be a "Kawaii Ambassador". Although embarrassed to utilize the title of Kawaii Ambassador at first, Misako's fulfillment of her travel duties as an ambassador allowed her to discover how much kawaii has spread throughout the world. Misako emphasizes the word kawaii to describe lolita fashion.  To promote lolita fashion worldwide,  in Fukuoka established the Japan Lolita Association with Misako as head of the association in 2013. She published a book in 2014 titled ロリータファッションBOOK deriving her experiences of wearing lolita fashion.

References 
Notes

Bibliography

 Aoki, Misako. (2011). 青木美沙子のカワイイ革命　～ロリータときどきナース. Tokyo: Takeshobo.  
 Aoki, Misako. (2014). ロリータファッションBOOK. Tokyo: Mynavi.

External links 
Misako's Official Blog 
Misako Aoki on Twin Planet Entertainment 
Misako Aoki on Internet Movie Database

Japanese female models
Models from Chiba Prefecture
Japanese nurses
Lolita fashion
1983 births
Tokai University alumni
Living people